Wang Jianxun (born 4 November 1981) is a Chinese ski jumper. He competed in the large hill team event at the 2006 Winter Olympics.

References

1981 births
Living people
Chinese male ski jumpers
Olympic ski jumpers of China
Ski jumpers at the 2006 Winter Olympics
People from Tonghua